Tamara Rahn is a fictional character appearing in American comic books published by Marvel Comics. She is an alien of the water-breathing extraterrestrial Banari race from the planet Laab and a red-skinned humanoid with blonde hair.

Publication history

Tamara Rahn first appeared in Sub-Mariner #58 (Feb 1973), and was created by Bill Everett (writer), Steve Gerber (writer), and Sam Kweskin (artist).

Namor, the Sub-Mariner writer Glenn Herdling recounted that his predecessor on the series, Bob Harras, "had brought back Tamara Rahn and had introduced a love affair between her and Tiger Shark, which I went with. Bob had given me only one dictate: Don't kill Tamara! It was actually a blessing, because in the 'Starblast' crossover I was able to provide closure to the story that had introduced her 20 years earlier."

Fictional character biography
Tamara was born on the planet Laab, which has since been destroyed. Tamara stowed away on the spacecraft which brought the males of her race to Earth, where all except Tamara were killed by the Atlanteans, who mistook them for enemies. The other females of the race apparently perished on their dying home world.

She sought vengeance against the Atlanteans, but was foiled by Namor the Sub-Mariner. She was forgiven and befriended by Namor and Lord Vashti, and made an honorary Atlantean citizen. She was then captured by surface men, and Namor sought to rescue her. She was freed during the Atlantean invasion. With Namor the Sub-Mariner and Namorita, she freed the Hydro-Base amphibians from Dr. Hydro. Later, she helped Namor fight Orka.

With Namorita and the Hydro-Base amphibians, also known as the Hydro-Men, she was held captive by Doctor Dorcas, Tiger Shark, and Attuma, but was freed by Namor and Doctor Doom. She teamed up with Namorita, Doctor Doom, and the Hydro-Men against the Avengers at Hydro-Base, and defeated the Wasp. However, alongside the Avengers, Namor, and Doctor Doom, she then battled Attuma.

Tamara briefly appeared during the Contest of Champions.
 
Tamara later helped Tiger Shark battle the Faceless Ones. She then brought Tiger Shark to Atlantis and was reunited with Namor. She saved Tiger Shark from the Nereid, and helped Namor fight Suma-ket and was rescued by Neptune. Alongside Namor, Tiger Shark, and the Atlanteans, she battled Kuma-Set and helped reclaim Atlantis from the Unforgiven Dead.

Tamara took Tiger Shark as a lover for a time. She helped Namor, Stingray, Triton, Tiger Shark, Lyja, and the Fantastic Four battle the Starblasters. Xlym exterminated her remaining fellow Banari, and Tamara executed Xlym.

Tamara and Tiger Shark were investigated and beaten by Llyra and her son Llyron, and strung up outside the gates of Atlantis. They were rescued by Namor and taken for medical treatment. Tamara was also a member of his short-lived Deep Six team.

Tamara was used by the Radioactive Man to infect At'la'tique with a radiation plague.

Powers and abilities
Thanks to her alien physiology, Tamara has superhuman strength on Earth, which increases under water, although she has an inability to breathe out of water in Earth air for more than a few minutes without artificial aid. She has superhuman water speed, stamina, and durability. She has the ability to survive underwater for indefinite periods, and specially developed vision which gives her the ability to see clearly in the murky depths of the ocean.

Tamara is an excellent hand-to-hand combatant, and is trained in Atlantean forms of armed and unarmed combat. She speaks English, Atlantean, and Lemurian, and is a highly skilled business executive.

References

Characters created by Bill Everett
Characters created by Steve Gerber
Comics characters introduced in 1973
Marvel Comics aliens
Marvel Comics female superheroes
Marvel Comics female supervillains